"A Lover's Holiday" is the debut single by Change, from the album The Glow of Love.  "A Lover's Holiday", along with the album's title track and "Searching" were very successful on the dance charts, spending nine weeks at #1 - the all-time record. The three tracks were the most successful dance chart entries for 1980.  Lead vocals for tracks: "Glow of Love" and "Searching" were performed by Luther Vandross. While "A Lover's Holiday" was a hit on the soul singles chart peaking at #5, and peaking at #40 on the Hot 100, "The Glow of Love" was the band's most successful single in Italy, peaking at #2 on the local hit parade.

Track listing
 US 7" Single
 "A Lover's Holiday" - 3:50
 "The End" - 3:55

 UK 7" Single
 "A Lover's Holiday" - 3:50
 "The Glow of Love" - 3:40

 US Promo 12" Single
 "A Lover's Holiday" - 6:26

 UK 12" Single
 "A Lover's Holiday"
 "The Glow of Love"

Personnel
 Arrangement and Conductor - Davide Romani and Paolo Gianolio
 Orchestra - Goody Music Orchestra
 Producer - Jacques Fred Petrus
 Mixing - Jim Burgess

Chart positions

In pop culture
 Happy Mondays used a sample of this song for their song, "Holiday", off their 1990 album, Pills 'n' Thrills and Bellyaches.
 The song is sampled by R. Kelly in his 1998 song "Spendin' Money" from his album R..
 The song is heard during a party scene in the 2009 film, Couples Retreat.
 The song is heard on the radio "K-109 The Studio" in the popular video game, Grand Theft Auto: The Ballad of Gay Tony.
 The song is sampled by Naughty By Nature for their song "Holiday".
 The song is also heard in the Italian wedding scene on the Netflix series “Master of None” starring Aziz Ansari
Episode 2 Le Nozze Season 2

References

1980 debut singles
Holiday songs
Change (band) songs
1980 songs
Warner Records singles